Vector 3 is a science fiction combat microgame published by Simulations Publications, Inc. (SPI) in 1979.

Description
Vector 3 is a tactical space combat game involving two warring civilizations of the heavily populated Gilgamesh Cluster. The game includes four scenarios. Before combat begins, each player must design their spaceships, using a point-buy system to purchase various weapons, defenses and other systems.

Components
The  ziplock bag  contains:
 folded colour sheet with front cover title/art and back cover text
 two  square grid paper maps (X-Y and X-Z)
 100 die-cut counters
 rule sheet
 sheet of game aids

Movement
Ship movement uses Newtonian mechanics and is tracked in three dimensions, simultaneously using separate X-Y and X-Z charts.

Victory conditions
Players receive Victory Points for destroying system pods and ships. The game ends when the last ship on one side is either destroyed or disengages from battle and leaves the map. At that point, the player with the most Victory Points is the winner.

Publication history
Metagaming Concepts dominated the microgame market in the 1970s with games like O.G.R.E. and G.E.V. SPI was the first game company to mount a serious challenge to Metagaming, entering the microgame market in 1979 with six games packaged in ziplock bags: two "Fantasy Capsule" games (Demons and Deathmaze), and four science fiction "Space Capsule" games: The Creature That Ate Sheboygan, Stargate, Titan Strike!, and Vector 3, a microgame designed by Greg Costikyan, with artwork by Rick Bryant, Redmond A. Simonsen, and Charles Vess. 

After the demise of SPI, rights to the game became a Creative Commons Attribution-NonCommercial licence.

Reception
In Issue 21 of Phoenix, Paul King thought that in some respects, SPI had outdone Metagaming, with more colorful counters, and well-written rules that enabled players to begin play within 10 minutes. He also noted that "Once started, the action in fast and furious." King believed the point-buy system for designing ships was one of the high points of the game. He concluded with a strong recommendation, saying, "For the science fiction buff, the game is a must. For the gamer who fancies something different, it is worth having — the only limiting factor is your imagination."

In Issue 29 of The Space Gamer, Ronald Pehr was not impressed with the game, saying, "In short, the game is too busy. Once you've played a game of Vector 3 you find yourself in no hurry to play again.".

In Issue 27 of Simulacrum, Brian Train noted, "It's all very involved, even for only four pages of rules, and an example of something that would be much better received today as a computer game. Even though I know my squares and square roots, it’s not something I would spend time on today."

Other reviews
American Wargamer, Vol. 6 #10
American Wargamer, Vol. 7 #1

References

Board games introduced in 1979
Science fiction board wargames
Simulations Publications games